Edward Norman "Ike" Corey (born Ed Cohen from July 13, 1894 to September 17, 1970) was a Major League Baseball pitcher. Corey played one game in his career, in the 1918 season, with the Chicago White Sox. He pitched two innings, giving up one run, on two hits, with one walk allowed. He had a 4.50 ERA.

Corey was born in Chicago, Illinois and died in Kenosha, Wisconsin, and was Jewish.

References

External links

1894 births
1970 deaths
Chicago White Sox players
Baseball players from Chicago
Louisville Colonels (minor league) players
Buffalo Bisons (minor league) players
Burials in Wisconsin
Jewish American baseball players
Jewish Major League Baseball players
20th-century American Jews